Death Before Dishonor is a 1987 American action film directed by Terry Leonard.

Plot
Gunnery Sergeant Burns (Fred Dryer) is in charge of the Marine Security Guard detachment at a United States embassy in the Middle East. When terrorists attack the compound, taking hostages, Burns becomes a one-man Marine Corps in an attempt to rescue the hostages and kill the terrorists.

Cast
 Fred Dryer as Gunnery Sergeant Burns
 Brian Keith as Colonel Halloran
 Kasey Walker as Maude
 Joanna Pacula as Elli
 Joseph Gian as Sergeant Manuel Ramirez
 Sasha Mitchell as Ruggieri
 Peter Parros as James
 Paul Winfield as The Ambassador
 Rockne Tarkington as "Jihad"
 Dan Chodos as Amin
 Mohammad Bakri as Gavril
 Chaim Girafi as Zabib
 Tuvia Tavi as Elias
 Yossi Ashdot as Hamed

Production
Death Before Dishonor marked the directorial debut for Terry J. Leonard, who was primarily known for his stunt work, but had also served as a second unit director for several feature films and television shows.  The film was originally scheduled to shoot in Yugoslavia, but producer Lawrence Kubik received a telephone call warning him not to come to Yugoslavia, consequently, the location was moved to Israel, where production costs were lower. The film shot in Tel Aviv, Jerusalem and Jaffa.

Home media
The film was released on DVD on April 17, 2001, by Anchor Bay Entertainment.

References

External links

1987 films
1987 action films
American action films
New World Pictures films
Films about the United States Marine Corps
Films about terrorism in the United States
Films set in the Middle East
Films shot in Israel
Films scored by Brian May (composer)
1980s English-language films
1980s American films